CommaVid Inc. was a game developer and publisher for the Atari 2600 that released six games between 1981 and 1983, plus a programming tool for the console. The company was founded by Dr. Irwin Gaines, Dr. John Bronstein, and Dr. Joseph Biel under the name Computer Magic Video, which was shortened to Com Ma Vid, or CommaVid. It was based in Aurora, Illinois.

In addition to developing its own titles, CommaVid ported the arcade game Venture to the 2600 for Coleco.

Products

Games
The following games were released by CommaVid:
Cakewalk, similar to Tapper in gameplay
Cosmic Swarm
Mines of Minos
Room of Doom
Stronghold

MagicCard
MagiCard is an Atari 2600 programming tool on a cartridge that originally came with a 100-page manual and was only available via mail order. According to CommaVid co-owner Gaines, 50 to 100 MagiCard cartridges were produced.

Video Life
Video Life is a version of the cellular automaton known as Conway's Game of Life for the Atari 2600. Video Life was only available through a special mail order offer to owners of CommaVid's Magicard. Fewer than 20 cartridges of Video Life were made. A 2003 report in the Chicago Reader by Jeffrey Felshman estimates that cartridges would sell for as much $3000 at the time.

Unreleased prototypes
Frog Demo
Mission Omega
Rush Hour
Underworld

References

Atari 2600
Defunct video game companies of the United States
Video game companies established in 1981
Video game companies disestablished in 1983
Video game development companies